This is a list of parliamentary constituencies that changed political allegiance in the United Kingdom general election on 7 May 2015. This includes those seats that changed parties in by-elections but were regained on 7 May. It does not include those where a new member has been elected from the same party as the previous incumbent.

Constituencies

See also
 2015 United Kingdom general election

References

2015 United Kingdom general election